Vazirov is an Azerbaijani surname. It is a slavicised version of Vazir. Notable people with the surname include:

 Abdurrahman Vazirov (1930–2022), Azerbaijani politician
 Hashim bey Vazirov (1868–1916), Azerbaijani journalist, writer and publisher
 Mir Hasan Vazirov (1889–1918), Azerbaijani politician and revolutionary
 Najaf bey Vazirov (1854–1926), Azerbaijani playwright and journalist

Azerbaijani-language surnames